Bacillaria paxillifer is a colonial diatom species in the family Bacillariaceae.

Colonies of this diatom are motile. Members (with their long axes parallel to one another) slide against their neighbors in a coordinated fashion, allowing the entire structure to expand or contract.

References

External links

Plants described in 1951
Bacillariales